William Brownell was an American professional basketball player and coach. Brownell played in the National Basketball League for the Toledo Jim White Chevrolets in 1941–42 and the Cleveland Chase Brassmen in 1943–44. He averaged 2.0 points per game in five career games played. While playing for Cleveland, Brownell also served as their head coach for the final one-third of the season after Vito Kubilus was relieved of the role.

References

American men's basketball players
Centers (basketball)
Cleveland Chase Brassmen coaches
Cleveland Chase Brassmen players
Toledo Jim White Chevrolets players